This is a list of the National Register of Historic Places in Hudspeth County, Texas

This is intended to be a complete list of properties and districts listed on the National Register of Historic Places in Hudspeth County, Texas. There are three districts and 85 individual properties listed on the National Register in the county.

Current listings

The publicly disclosed locations of National Register properties and districts may be seen in a mapping service provided.

|}

See also

National Register of Historic Places listings in Guadalupe Mountains National Park
National Register of Historic Places listings in Texas
Recorded Texas Historic Landmarks in Hudspeth County

References

External links

 
Hudspeth County